Phil Blake (born 24 November 1963) is a former rugby league footballer and a professional rugby union coach.

He represented New South Wales on one occasion.

Blake has held coaching positions with the Wallabies, Western Force, Manly RUFC and Leicester Tigers.

Early life
Blake was born in London, England, but moved to Sydney with his family at an early age. While attending Christian Brothers College in Manly, Blake played for the Australian Schoolboys team in 1981. Phil Blake is the younger brother of former Manly, Canberra and South Sydney player Michael Blake.

Playing career

Manly
Blake made his début for the Manly-Warringah Sea Eagles in Round 12 of the 1982 season, coming off the bench for the Sea Eagles in their 20–19 win over Eastern Suburbs at Brookvale Oval. Blake played 14 games in his rookie year, playing five-eighth, centre and halfback. He scored 9 tries in 1982, and was a try scorer for Manly in their 21–8 loss to defending premiers Parramatta in the 1982 Grand Final. Blake won the Dally M Rookie of the Year award.

Blake's good form continued in 1983, cementing his position as the club's first choice halfback. He broke the Sea Eagles club record for the most tries scored in a season with 27 the top try scorer in the league. Blake's 27 tries were scored from just 23 games played and was only surpassed in 2021 as the Manly club record for most tries in a premiership season. Manly won through to the 1983 Grand Final, again against Parramatta, and for the second time in two seasons.

After playing 21 of his 23 games at halfback in 1983, he played there only 10 times in 1984, spending most of his time at centre as coach Fulton tried to cover his defensive lapses. This also allowed Fulton to play others (such as halfback Des Hasler who had joined the club from Penrith) in their preferred positions. After scoring 27 tries in 23 games in 1983, Blake scored only 11 tries from 23 games in 1984.

Blake broke his arm during the opening round of the 1985 season against Penrith. He returned to the field in Round 9 against Canberra, but was again used in various backline positions and only scored 3 tries in 11 games.

During the 1985/86 off-season Phil Blake traveled to England and played for Warrington, he played left-, i.e. number 4, (replaced by interchange/substitute Mark Forster) in Warrington's 8–34 defeat by Wigan in the 1985 Lancashire County Cup Final during the 1985–86 season at Knowsley Road, St. Helens, on Sunday 13 October 1985,

In the 1986 NSWRL season, Blake was again the league's top try scorer with 13, sharing the mark with Balmain's Great Britain international import Garry Schofield and despite having that statistic, for the second time in a Kangaroo Tour year, he was overlooked for selection on the 1986 Kangaroo tour. However, after four seasons under Fulton, he was unwanted by Manly and following the season signed to play for the South Sydney Rabbitohs from 1987.

Souths
In 1987, Blake joined Rabbitohs and went on to play four seasons for the club. He played 75 games for Souths.

He returned to England to play for Wigan for the 1988/89 season. After returning from England, Blake, and Souths went from being minor premiers in 1989 to finishing with the wooden spoon in 1990, the biggest slide from grace in the competition's history.

Nomad

After three seasons at Souths, Blake joined the North Sydney Bears for 1991, however despite the Bears reaching the finals for the first time since 1982, he only played eleven games for the club and moved again at the end of the year, joining the Canberra Raiders.

Blake moved again at the end of the 1992 season, joining the St. George Dragons. He came off the reserves bench for the Dragons in the 1993 Grand Final who lost their second Grand Final in two seasons to the Brisbane Broncos. It was Blake's 3rd Grand Final loss in his 3rd attempt after having lost the 1982 and 1983 Grand Finals with Manly.

In 1995, he joined the new Auckland Warriors franchise, and was in their inaugural run-on side. He played three seasons for the club, his longest spell at one club since the Rabbitohs. Phil Blake, who played  in the Warrior's first game against the Broncos at Auckland's Mount Smart Stadium before 29,220 fans, scored the new club's first ever try in the game's 21st minute after a dash down the left wing by Whetu Taewa. Blake, as always there in support, had an easy 10m run to the line. Despite this the Warriors went down narrowly to the two time premiership winners 25–22.

Representative career
Despite narrowly missing out on a Kangaroos jersey in 1982 and again in 1986, Blake never established himself at representative level. In 1988, he played for City, and in 1989 he came off the bench in a State of Origin match for New South Wales, but that was the extent of his representative career. Along with Ian Roberts and James McManus, he is to date one of three British-born players to play State of Origin.

In 1988, Blake was selected at fullback for an Australian select side called the President's XIII to play the touring Great Britain Lions. On a wet and muddy day at the Seiffert Oval in Canberra, the President's XIII defeated the Lions 24–18.

Retirement
Blake trained with the Manly team at the start of the 1998 season before announcing his retirement. He finished his career having played 261 games, scoring 138 tries as well as kicking eight goals and fifteen field goals.

Coaching career

Rugby league
Blake was appointed the sprint coach at the South Sydney Rabbitohs for their return season in 2002. When Craig Coleman was fired as head coach at the beginning of the 2003 season, Blake was appointed the temporary head coach until he was replaced by Paul Langmack.

Rugby union
In 2006 Blake began his rugby union coaching career as assistant coach of the Southern Districts first grade side. He joined Manly as head coach a year later. Blake suffered from a series of potentially life-threatening blood clots in 2008 and spent some time in hospital. In 2010, he underwent triple heart bypass surgery.

After taking Manly into the semi-finals in 2010, Blake was appointed as defence and skills coach to the Wallabies under head coach Robbie Deans. He joined the Western Force as defence and skills coach for the 2011 season. When Richard Graham was stood down as head coach of the Force during the 2012 season, Blake became the interim head coach before Michael Foley was appointed for the 2013 season.

Blake returned to Manly as head coach in 2013. In 2014, he was appointed as head coach of the North Harbour Rays for the inaugural National Rugby Championship season. However, on 2 June 2014 it was announced that he had been appointed as defence coach for Leicester Tigers in the English Premiership. Blake incurred a six-month ban from rugby for breaching RFU betting rules after placing eight separate bets on two Tigers games while he was the defence coach at the club.

References

External links
Soaring Eagles Phil Blake Bio
South Sydney Phil Blake Bio
rugbyleague.co.nz Phil Blake Bio

1963 births
Living people
Rugby league players from London
Australian rugby league players
New South Wales Rugby League State of Origin players
Manly Warringah Sea Eagles players
New South Wales City Origin rugby league team players
Warrington Wolves players
South Sydney Rabbitohs players
Wigan Warriors players
North Sydney Bears players
Canberra Raiders players
St. George Dragons players
New Zealand Warriors players
Rugby league utility players
Rugby league fullbacks
Australian rugby league coaches
Australian rugby union coaches
Western Force coaches
Australian people of British descent
English emigrants to Australia
Leicester Tigers coaches
People from London
South Sydney Rabbitohs captains